The Chulitna River (Dena'ina: Ts'ilutnu) is a 110 km long right tributary of the Susitna River in southern part of interior Alaska. Three forks converge to form the river, which itself flows into the Susitna River near Talkeetna.

Geography 
Chulitna River  originates from the confluence of Middle and East Fork Chulitna River in the valley between the Alaska Range and Talkeetna Mountains east of Denali, flows in a southerly direction to Talkeetna, where both it and the Talkeetna River empty into  the Susitna River, which flows into Cook Inlet.  Larger tributaries include West Fork Chulitna River, Ohio Creek, Fountain River, Hidden River, Coffee River and Tokositna River, all from the right.  The catchment area of the Chulitna River covers about 6600 km2.  The mean discharge near the mouth is 250 m³ / s.  The highest monthly discharges of the river, which is mainly fed by glacial meltwater, occur in the months of June to August.

The George Parks Highway from Anchorage to Fairbanks runs parallel to the entire river.

The name of the river is of local Alaska's natives and was documented in 1898 by G.H. Eldridge.

References

Matanuska-Susitna Borough, Alaska
Rivers of Alaska